Ytre Hvaler National Park (literally Outer Hvaler National Park) is a national park located within the municipalities of Hvaler and Fredrikstad in Østfold, Norway. The park was established on 26 June 2009 and was the first national marine  park in the country of Norway.

Ytre Hvaler is mostly a marine park, covering the outer parts of the skerries of the east shore of Oslofjord. To the south, the national park's boundaries lie  on the Norway–Sweden border next to Kosterhavet National Park.

Settlements in the area may have been as old as the Bronze Age. The park is dominated by the coastal culture which has used the area for centuries, resulting in it including boathouses for fishing. Akerøya was settled between 1682 and 1807. There are more than 50 shipwrecks in the park, the most prominent being the Danish frigate  which was lost during the Christmas Flood of 1717.

Within the park are two lighthouses: Torbjørnskjær and Homlungen, both of which are operated by the Norwegian Coastal Administration. The islands remain in use for grazing.
The park includes the Tisler Reef, a cold water coral reef, consisting mostly of Lophelia. The Tisler Reef is the largest known coral reef in sheltered waters in Europe, and is located near the island of Tisler.

Gallery

References

External links 
Ytre Hvaler National Park website

National parks of Norway
Protected areas established in 2009
2009 establishments in Norway
Hvaler
Fredrikstad
Marine parks
Oslofjord